Perthia is a genus of crustaceans belonging to the monotypic family Perthiidae.

The species of this genus are found in Southern Australia.

Species:

Perthia acutitelson 
Perthia branchialis

References

Amphipoda